Ibrahim Agboola Gambari,   (born 24 November 1944), is a Nigerian academic and diplomat who is currently serving as Chief of Staff to the President of Nigeria.

Early life and education
Ibrahim Agboola Gambari was born on 24 November 1944 in Ilorin, Kwara State to a Fulani ruling class family. His nephew Ibrahim Sulu Gambari is the Emir of Illorin.

Gambari attended King's College, Lagos. He subsequently attended the London School of Economics where he obtained his B. Sc. (Economics) degree (1968) with specialisation in International Relations. He later obtained his M.A. (1970) and Ph. D. (1974) degrees from Columbia University, New York, United States in Political Science /International Relations.

Academic career
Gambari began his teaching career in 1969 at City University of New York before working at University of Albany. Later, he taught at Ahmadu Bello University, in Zaria, Kaduna State. From 1986 to 1989, he was Visiting Professor at three universities in Washington, D.C.: Johns Hopkins School of Advanced International Studies, Georgetown University and Howard University. He has also been a research fellow at the Brookings Institution also in Washington D.C. and a Resident Scholar at the Bellagio Study and Conference Center, the Rockefeller Foundation-run center in Italy. He has written so many books and published in reputable journals in foreign policy and international relations, such as 'Theory and Reality in Foreign Policy: Nigeria after second Republic',

Foreign policy

Nigeria
Gambari served as the Minister for External Affairs between 1984 and 1985 under General Muhammadu Buhari's military regime, after he was the director general of The Nigerian Institute of International Affairs (NIIA). From 1990 to 1999, he holds the record of being the longest serving Nigerian Ambassador to the United Nations, serving under five Heads of State and Presidents.

United Nations
Gambari has held several positions in the United Nations. In 1999, he was the President of UNICEF and later became UN Under Secretary-General and the first Special Adviser on Africa to the UN Secretary General Kofi Annan from 1999 to 2005. He was the Under-Secretary-General of the United Nations for Political Affairs from 2005 to 2007 under Secretary-General's Kofi Annan and Ban Ki-Moon. His last appointment in the UN was from January 2010 to July 2012, when he was appointed by Ban Ki-moon and the Chairperson of the African Union Commission as the Joint African Union-United Nations Special Representative for Darfur.

Honours and memberships

Founder and Chairman of the Savannah Centre
Gambari is the co-chair of the Albright-Gambari Commission
He is a member of the Johns Hopkins University's Society of Scholars
He was decorated with the title of Commander of the Federal Republic (CFR) by the Government of Nigeria
He was accorded, honoris causa, the title of Doctor of Humane Letters (D.Hum.Litt.) from the University of Bridgeport
On 4 March 2013, Ibrahim Gambari was named by the Governor of Kwara Abdulfatah Ahmad, as the Chancellor of the Kwara State University

Footnotes

External links

UN Biography Ibrahim Gambari
Department of Political Affairs, United Nations Headquarters, Professor Ibrahim Agboola Gambari Under-Secretary-General/Special Adviser on Africa, New York, January, 2000 (biography)
List of recent speeches

Nigerian officials of the United Nations
1944 births
Living people
Alumni of the London School of Economics
School of International and Public Affairs, Columbia University alumni
Howard University faculty
Georgetown University faculty
Johns Hopkins University alumni
Academic staff of Ahmadu Bello University
Kwara State
Nigerian diplomats
Permanent Representatives of Nigeria to the United Nations
King's College, Lagos alumni
Yoruba academics
Yoruba politicians
Nigerian expatriate academics in the United States
Kwara State University people
People from Ilorin
Nigerian scholars
Chairmen and Presidents of UNICEF